This is a list of monarchs who were Freemasons, and lists individual monarchs chronologically under the countries they ruled, monarchs who ruled more than one country are listed under the one they are most known for, or the dominant nation in a personal union (i.e. Christian X listed under Denmark and not Iceland). Those listed below were members of a Freemason Lodge sometime during their lives. Some, like Alexander I of Russia, would later outlaw Freemasonry in their territories, while others would continue supporting the organization for the rest of their lives.

Andorra
 Jules Grévy
 Alexandre Millerand
 Gaston Doumergue
 Paul Doumer – Grand Secretary of the Grand Orient of France (1892)

Anhalt-Köthen
 Friedrich-Ferdinand

Afghanistan
 Habibullah Khan

Baden
 Karl Friedrich – Grandmaster of the National Lodge of Baden

Bavaria
 Maximilian I Joseph

Belgium
 Leopold I

Bikaner
 Ganga Singh

Brandenburg-Ansbach
 Karl Wilhelm Friedrich
 Karl Alexander – Amicus eminens et protector ordinis in Franconia

Brandenburg-Bayreuth
 Friedrich
 Friedrich Christian

Brazil
 Pedro I

Breslau
 Philipp Gotthard von Schaffgotsch
 Joseph Christian Franz zu Hohenlohe-Waldenburg-Bartenstein

Brunswick
 Karl I
 Ferdinand

Bulgaria
 Alexander I

Carnatic
 Ghulam Husain Ali Khan

Cooch Behar
 Nripendra Narayan

Courland
 Karl Christian Joseph – Superior et Protector Ordinis in Saxonia

Denmark
 Fredrik V
 Fredrik VI
 Christian IX
 Fredrik VII
 Christian VIII – Grandmaster of the Danish Order of Freemasons
 Fredrik VIII
 Christian X

Egypt
 Tawfiq
 Abbas II
 Hussein Kamel
 Fuad I
 Farouk

Frankfurt
 Eugène de Beauharnais – Grand Master of the Grand Orient of Italy (1805-1814), Grand Commander of the Supreme Council of Italy

Ghana 
 Ofori Atta I (Okyenhene or King of Akyem Abuakwa) – (1912-1943)
 Azzu Mate Kole II (Konor of the Manya Krobo Traditional Area) – (1939-1990)
 Osei Tutu Agyeman Prempeh II (Asantehene) – (1931-1970)
 Oyeeman Wereko Ampem II (Gyaasehene of Akuapem and Amanokromhene) – (1975-2005)
 Osei Tutu Agyeman Prempeh II, Asantehene, 1931 – 1970
 Otumfuo Osei Tutu II (Asantehene) – (1999–present), Grand Patron, Grand Lodge of Ghana and Sword Bearer, United Grand Lodge of England

Greece
 Geórgios I
 Konstantínos I
 Geórgios II

Gwalior
 Jiwajirao Scindia

Germany
 Wilhelm I
 Friedrich III – Master of the Order, Grand Landlodge of the Freemasons of Germany

Hanover
 Ernst August – Grandmaster of the Grandlodge of Hanover
 Georg V – Protector of Freemasonry in Hanover, Grandmaster of the Grandlodge of Hanover

Hawaii
 Kamehameha IV
 Kamehameha V
 Kalākaua

Hesse-Darmstadt
 Ludwig VIII
 Ludwig X

Holland
 Lodewijk I – Deputy Grand Master of the Grand Orient of France (1805)

Holy Roman Empire
 Franz I

Hyderabad
 Mir Osman Ali Khan

Jaipur
 Bhawani Singh

Johor

 Ibrahim Al-Masyhur

Jordan
 Al-Ḥusayn ibn Ṭalāl

Mascara
 Abd al-Qādir ibn Muḥyiddīn

Mecklenburg-Schwerin
 Friedrich Ludwig

Mecklenburg-Strelitz
 Adolph Friedrich IV
 Karl II – Patron of the united Lodges of the dominions of the Electorate of Brunswick, Duchy of Mecklenburg, Principalities of Münster-Waldeck and Hildesheim

Mexico
 Augustin I
 Maximilian I

Moldavia
 Constantin Mavrocordat
 Mihai Draco Suțu
 Alexandru Ipsianti

Montenegro
 Petar II Petrović-Njegoš

Mysore
 Jayachamarajendra Wadiyar

Naples
 Gioacchino I

Netherlands
 Willem II

Norway
 Haakon VII

Ottoman Empire
 Murad V

Pataudi
 Mansoor Ali Khan Pataudi

Patiala
 Bhupinder Singh

Perak
 Idris Shah II

Poland
 Stanisław II August

Portugal
 Fernando II

Prussia
 Friedrich II
 Friedrich Wilhelm II
 Friedrich Wilhelm III

Rampur
 Raza Ali Khan – Grandmaster of the Grand Lodge of India

Reuss-Lobenstein
 Heinrich LXXII

Romania
 Alexandru Ioan I
 Carol II

Russia
 Aleksandr I

Sarawak
 James Brooke

Saxe-Coburg-Gotha
 Ernst II

Saxe-Gotha-Altenburg
 Johann Adolf
 Ernst II

Saxe-Meiningen
 Karl Friedrich III
 Karl Wilhelm
 Georg I Friedrich Karl

Saxe-Weimar-Eisenach
 Karl August

Serbia
 Mihailo III
 Aleksander
 Petar I

Sikh Empire
 Duleep Singh

Spain
 José I – Grand Master of the Grand Orient of France (1805)
 Amadeo I

Sweden
 Adolf Fredrik – Master of a Stockholm lodge
 Gustaf III – Vicar of Solomon
 Karl XIII – Grandmaster of the Swedish Order of Freemasons, and Army Master of the Order of Strict Observance
 Karl XIV Johan – Grandmaster of the Swedish Order of Freemasons, and of the Norwegian Order of Freemasons
 Oscar I – Grandmaster of the Swedish Order of Freemasons, and of the Norwegian Order of Freemasons
 Karl XV – Grandmaster of the Swedish Order of Freemasons, and of the Norwegian Order of Freemasons
 Oscar II – Grandmaster of the Swedish Order of Freemasons, and of the Norwegian Order of Freemasons
 Gustaf V – Grandmaster of the Swedish Order of Freemasons
 Gustaf VI Adolf – Grandmaster of the Swedish Order of Freemasons

United Kingdom

 James VI – Fellowcraft Freemason (Lodge Scoon and Perth No. 3 in Perth) (1601-1625)
 George IV – Grand Master of the Premier Grand Lodge of England (1790-1813)
 William IV
 Edward VII – Grand Master of the United Grand Lodge of England (1874-1901)
 Edward VIII
 George VI – Grand Master of the Grand Lodge of Scotland (1936-1937)

Wallachia
 Scarlat Ghica
 Grigore II Ghica
 Alexandru Moruzi

Westphalia
 Jérôme I – Grand Master of the Grand Orient of Westphalia

Wurttemberg
 Friedrich II Eugen
 Friedrich I

Yugoslavia
 Aleksandar I

References

See also
 List of presidents of the United States who were Freemasons
 List of Freemasons

Monarchs
Freemasons
Monarchs